The wedgesnout ctenotus (Ctenotus euclae)  is a species of skink found in South Australia and Western Australia.

References

euclae
Reptiles described in 1971
Taxa named by Glen Milton Storr